Station Square is a  indoor and outdoor shopping and entertainment complex located in the South Shore neighborhood of Pittsburgh, Pennsylvania, United States across the Monongahela River from the Golden Triangle of downtown Pittsburgh. Station Square occupies the buildings and land formerly occupied by the historic Pittsburgh & Lake Erie Railroad Complex, including the Pittsburgh & Lake Erie Railroad Station, which are separately listed on the National Register of Historic Places.

With  of retail space, it features nearly 60 stores, restaurants and entertainment venues, including Highmark Stadium and the 396-room Sheraton at Station Square. As one of Pittsburgh's largest tourist destinations, it attracts more than three million people annually, including many Pittsburgh natives. The retail development was built at the location of a former station on the Pittsburgh and Lake Erie Railroad, with many of the original structures such as the freight house building and the concourse being converted into restaurants and a shopping mall. Proximity to a stop on the Port Authority of Allegheny County 'T' Pittsburgh Light Rail system and the dock for the Gateway Clipper Fleet of local river cruise boats makes Station Square a major parking and jumping-off point for activities and events around the city. The property is operated by Brookfield Asset Management.

In 1979, the Station Square complex was listed on the National Register of Historic Places as the "Pittsburgh & Lake Erie Railroad Complex."

History

Station Square was conceptualized by Arthur P. Ziegler, Jr., one of the founding national leaders of historic preservation in the United States and President of the  Pittsburgh History and Landmarks Foundation, or Landmarks.  Landmarks developed the site in 1976 as a mixed-use historic adaptive reuse development that gave the foundation the opportunity to put its urban planning principles into practice. 

Aided by an initial gift from the Allegheny Foundation in 1976, Landmarks adapted five historic Pittsburgh and Lake Erie Railroad buildings for new uses and added a hotel, a dock for the Gateway Clipper Fleet and parking areas. Now, shops, offices, restaurants and entertainment anchor the historic riverfront site on the south shore of the Monongahela River, opposite the Golden Triangle (Pittsburgh). It reflects a $100 million investment from all sources, with the lowest public cost and highest taxpayer return of any major renewal project in the Pittsburgh region since the 1950s. In 1994, Pittsburgh History and Landmarks Foundation sold Station Square to Forest City Realty Trust which created an endowment to help support its restoration efforts and educational programs. Each year the staff and docents of Pittsburgh History and Landmarks Foundation introduce more than 10,000 people — teachers, students, adults, and visitors — to the architectural heritage of the Pittsburgh region and to the value of historic preservation.

See also
Pittsburgh & Lake Erie Railroad Station

References

External links
Station Square website
Post Gazette article on possible sale

Railway stations on the National Register of Historic Places in Pennsylvania
Transport infrastructure completed in 1897
Pittsburgh and Lake Erie Railroad
Forest City Realty Trust
Tourist attractions in Pittsburgh
Entertainment districts in the United States
Shopping districts and streets in the United States
Economy of Pittsburgh
Redeveloped ports and waterfronts in the United States
1976 establishments in Pennsylvania
Buildings and structures in Pittsburgh
National Register of Historic Places in Pittsburgh